Since the 19th century, there have been several losses in both the Minnesota (north shore) and the Wisconsin (south shore) portion of western Lake Superior. Out of the known shipwrecks in the region, 25 of them are listed on the National Register of Historic Places. This list includes both shipwrecks in Lake Superior and the Saint Louis River.

Known shipwrecks of Minnesota

Probable shipwrecks of Minnesota

Known shipwrecks of Wisconsin

Probable shipwrecks of Wisconsin

See also
List of shipwrecks on the Great Lakes
List of Great Lakes shipwrecks on the National Register of Historic Places
List of shipwrecks in the Thunder Bay National Marine Sanctuary

References

Notes

Citations

Shipwrecks in the Great Lakes
Lake Superior
Lists of shipwrecks of the United States
Shipwrecks of the Minnesota coast
Shipwrecks of the Wisconsin coast